Parapercis queenslandica is a fish species in the sandperch family, Pinguipedidae. 
It is found in the Western Pacific from Australia and New Caledonia. 

References

Pinguipedidae
Taxa named by Hisashi Imamura
Taxa named by Tetsuo Yoshino
Fish described in 2007